Uncertain is a city in Harrison County, Texas, in the United States. According to the 2010 census, the city population was 94, down from 150 at the 2000 census. In 2020, it had a population of 85.

History

The city of Uncertain was incorporated in 1961 as a Type B general law city, with a mayor and five aldermen on an at-large basis.

Uncertain  has been noted for its unusual place name. According to tradition, the town derives its name from the original application for township where the name for it had not been decided. Therefore when the original residents filled out the application they put "Uncertain" in the blank for the name. When the township was given, it then became "Uncertain".

Geography
Uncertain is in the northeast corner of Harrison County, at the west end of Caddo Lake, a water body on Big Cypress Bayou that extends east into Louisiana. The city is at the east end of Farm Road 2198, which leads southwest  to Texas State Highway 43 near Karnack.

Demographics

At the 2000 census, there were 150 people, 77 households, and 49 families residing in the city. The population density was 294.1 people per square mile (113.6/km). There were 137 housing units at an average density of 268.7 per square mile (103.7/km). The racial makeup of the city was 72.67% White, 26.67% African American and 0.67% (i.e. 1 person) Native American. At the 2020 census, there were 85 people; the racial makeup of the city in 2020 was predominantly white.

Education
The city of Uncertain is served by the Karnack Independent School District.

In film
A 2017 documentary film Uncertain is about the city, several of its residents, and its lake with its extreme weed growth problem.
In 2010, several scenes from the film Shark Night 3D were filmed at Caddo Lake.
Some scenes in the Andy Sidaris film Picasso Trigger were filmed in Uncertain and in the Big Cypress Bayou.
In 1966, several scenes from the film Curse of the Swamp Creature were filmed around the local Fly-N-Fish Lodge Airport.

References

External links

 City of Uncertain visitors' website

Cities in Texas
Cities in Harrison County, Texas